X13 may refer to:

Cycle of Sixty/X13, a promotional EP issued by TVT Records in the United States
Crown of Ancient Glory, an adventure module for the Dungeons & Dragons fantasy role-playing game
Ryan X-13 Vertijet, an experimental Vertical Take-Off and Landing aircraft flown in the United States
Chris Higgins (musician), an American musician also known as "X-13", former The Offspring touring member
X13GG, an Esports organization in the State of Arizona also known as "X13 Squad" or "X13"